The Firm of Girdlestone is a British television series which was originally broadcast on the BBC in 1958. It is an adaptation of the 1890 novel The Firm of Girdlestone by Arthur Conan Doyle.

Cast

Main
 Andrew Cruickshank as John Girdlestone
 Alan Dobie as Ezra Girdlestone
 Elaine Usher as  Kate Harston
 James Sharkey as Tom Dimsdale
 Joseph O'Conor as Major Tobias Clutterbuck
 Patricia Cree as  Rebecca
 Leonard Sachs as Sigismund von Baumser

Other
 Wolfe Morris as Stevens
 Wensley Pithey as  Dr. Dimsdale
 Rachel Roberts as  Mrs. Scully
 Toke Townley as  Gilray
 Colin Broadley as  Jeb Parker
 Richard Coe as Perkins
 Bee Duffell as  Mrs. Jorrocks
 Shay Gorman as  Harry
 Gawn Grainger as  Robson
 Ann Heffernan as  Mrs. Dimsdale
 Geoffrey Hibbert as Jim
 Tim Hudson as Diamond miner
 Colin Jeavons as Farintosh
 Peter Lamsley as Diamond miner
 David Lander as Diamond miner
 David Ludman as  Diamond miner
 Carol Marsh as Miss Timms
 Peter Morny as Waiter
 Walter Randall as Diamond miner 
 Eric Thompson as Burt
 Sally Travers as Mrs. Hudson
 Andre Van Gyseghem as James Harston

References

Bibliography
Baskin, Ellen . Serials on British Television, 1950-1994. Scolar Press, 1996.

External links
 

BBC television dramas
1958 British television series debuts
1958 British television series endings
English-language television shows